Kyrgyz, Kirghiz or Kyrgyzstani may refer to:

 Someone or something related to Kyrgyzstan
Kyrgyz people
Kyrgyz national games
Kyrgyz language
Kyrgyz culture
Kyrgyz cuisine
Yenisei Kirghiz
The Fuyü Gïrgïs language in Northeastern China

Language and nationality disambiguation pages